Peter Ikhianosimhe Imoesi is a Nigerian molecular neuroscientist and research fellow at the Institute of Medical Sciences at the University of Aberdeen. He holds a PhD degree in medical sciences (translational neuroscience) from the School of Medicine, Medical Sciences and Nutrition at the University of Aberdeen. He is most notable for his research in the area that the hypothalamus play a significant role in the vitamin A homeostasis.

Imoesi, has been listed among the excellent Black scientists around the world, 2021. He has continued to freely educate and enlighten the public on COVID-19 vaccination and other health related topic through consultations for foremost African Mainstream Media Houses in Africa and Nigeria.

Biography

Early life and education
Imoesi was born in Auchi, Edo state, Nigeria, where his father Sir Peter Idinokhia Imoesi, and mother Eunice Imoesi were famous educators in his hometown in Edo State. Imoesi was educated at Okpodu Primary School, Ayogwiri, Auchi Edo State; and his secondary education at Ikeja High School and Ebenezer Comprehensive High School, Lagos State. He earned his BSc. Biochemistry from Ambrose Alli University, Nigeria. He arrived the United Kingdom in 2012 to advance his academic career where he graduated with a Distinction in Molecular Biology MSc at the University of Hertfordshire, England. He earned his PhD in Translational Neuroscience from the University of Aberdeen where he established that the hypothalamus may play a significant role in Vitamin A homeostasis, a new concept that had never been previously proposed. He also made a new discovery that reducing the activity of the gene retinol-binding protein 4 (Rbp4) in the mouse arcuate nucleus, may alter changes in body weight and food intake. He specializes in Neurodegenerative diseases, Drug discovery, Obesity studies and the manipulation of the hypothalamus, Biomolecule Homeostasis e.g. vitamin A homeostasis.

Career
Imoesi was appointed to the faculty at the department of Chemical sciences, Samuel Adegboyega University. He also served as the programme research lead coordinator for the department of Biochemistry from 2014 to 2016. During that period he was also appointed the Vice chairman, Biochemistry Department curriculum review and Editorial Board Member; College of Basic and Applied Sciences Journal amongst others.

Imoesi consults for several firms and non governmental organizations in Nigeria and beyond on COVID-19 and other health related topics. He has also published a research on the most effective testing methods, especially for the African continent. Imoesi is presently a STEM ambassador, North of Scotland, United Kingdom where he educates school children on the urgent need to study STEM and pursue a STEM career.

Currently, Imoesi is a Research Fellow at the School of Medicine, Medical Sciences and Nutrition, University of Aberdeen. And he research on neurodegenerative diseases e.g. Alzheimer's disease; and his research is focused on glutamate release in the synapse of a Tau transgenic mouse model that mimics the same clinical pathology as that of Alzheimer's disease and Frontotemporal Dementia. He is equally involved in Teaching and Tutoring of Medical and Biomedical students in the School of Medicine, Medical Sciences and Nutrition, University of Aberdeen.

He is a medical contributor for a variety of news channels including CBN Africa, Channels, AIT, TVC, News Central Africa, Galaxy TV.

Recognition

Awards

 2016-2019 - Elphinstone PhD Scholarship Award, University of Aberdeen.
 2018 - The Sir Richard Stapley Education Trust Fund. 
 2018 - Early Career Research Grant, MRC@Discovery Aberdeen
 2018 - International Conference Travel Fund – British Society for Neuroendocrinology
 2017 - Early Career Researcher Travel Grant (BSN).
 2017 - The Sir Richard Stapley Education Trust.

Nominations
 2022 - University of Aberdeen Excellence Awards.

Works

Books

Articles

References

External links
Thank you for contributing to the Covid- 19 effort University of Aberdeen
Explorathon - Dr Peter Imoesi at the University of Aberdeen institute of medical sciences tour

Living people
Year of birth missing (living people)
Nigerian neuroscientists
Alumni of the University of Aberdeen
People from Edo State
Ambrose Alli University alumni
Alumni of the University of Hertfordshire
Academic staff of Samuel Adegboyega University
British people of Nigerian descent
Academics of the University of Aberdeen